The 2010 Barcelona Ladies Open was a tennis tournament played on outdoor clay courts. It was the 4th edition of the Barcelona Ladies Open, and an International-level tournament on the 2010 WTA Tour. It took place at the David Lloyd Club Turó in Barcelona, Catalonia, Spain, from April 10 through April 17, 2010.

Entrants

Seeds

 Rankings are as of April 5, 2010.

Other entrants 
The following players received wildcards into the main draw:
  Lourdes Domínguez Lino
  Arantxa Parra Santonja
  Laura Pous Tió

The following players received entry from the qualifying draw:
  Alizé Cornet
  Simona Halep
  Silvia Soler Espinosa
  Maša Zec Peškirič

Champions

Singles

 Francesca Schiavone def.  Roberta Vinci, 6–1, 6-1
It was Schiavone's first title of the year and 3rd of her career.

Doubles

 Sara Errani /  Roberta Vinci def.  Timea Bacsinszky /  Tathiana Garbin, 6–1, 3–6, [10–2]
It was Errani's fourth doubles title and Vinci's fifth doubles title. It was also the second title of the team this year.

External links 
 

 
Barcelona Ladies Open
Barcelona Ladies Open
2010 in Catalan sport
Bar